Xiangyang Township is a township under the administration of Huanren Manchu Autonomous County, Liaoning, China. , it has 6 villages under its administration.

References 

Township-level divisions of Liaoning
Huanren Manchu Autonomous County